A strategic reserve is the reserve of a commodity or items that is held back from normal use by governments, organisations, or businesses in pursuance of a particular strategy or to cope with unexpected events.

A document issued by the US Department of Defense in 2005 defines a strategic reserve as follows: "An external reinforcing force which is not committed in advance to a specific Major Subordinate Command, but which can be deployed to any region for a mission decided at the time by the Major NATO Commander."

There are several national and international projects aiming to preserve the existing natural wealth and diversity in case of mass extinction or a global catastrophe. The Svalbard Global Seed Vault facility, opened in 2008, focuses on collecting duplicate samples of plant seeds from all around the world and currently contains close to 1 million different agricultural seed samples. The final storage capacity is said to be 4.5 million seed samples. Another such institution, Frozen Ark, concentrates on DNA preservation of endangered animal species for generations.

Types of strategic reserve
A strategic reserve can be:
 Financial in nature such as ring-fenced funding or capital reserves of a large corporation.
 A commodity, such as intervention stocks of food or petrol (see security of supply and strategic petroleum reserves)
 Specific machinery, such as railroad cars or steam locomotives, to be used in an emergency situation.

Examples of commodity reserves:

Global strategic petroleum reserves
Northeast Home Heating Oil Reserve
Strategic uranium reserves
National Helium Reserve
Strategic grain reserve
Gold reserve
International Strategic Reserve of the Federation of Quebec Maple Syrup Producers
Strategic National Stockpile – medical supplies in the U.S.

Certain countries create their own unusual strategic reserves of food or commodities they value the most, such as cotton, butter, pork, raisins or even maple syrup.

Energy strategic reserves 

Strategic reserve can be also applied as an economic instrument in order to stabilize investments in a specific industry and provide sufficient investment incentive as described in the following example. This time the strategic reserve is defined as a set of power plants or interruptible demand contracts, all controlled by the TSO (transmission system operator), that can be used during temporary lack electricity. The strategic reserve does not necessarily mean a change of available generation capacity, the TSO only takes the control over certain power plants or even averts some power stations from being decommissioned. The activation of such a strategic reserve due to shortage of generation volume at prices above the variable costs of the generation units can lead to a rise of the average electricity price and therefore spark more investments into the generation capacity sector, the main market purpose of the strategic reserve here consists of securing a corresponding investment incentive. One of the main European TSO's is a Belgian company Elia, that operates in Belgium and Germany.

References

Strategy
Inventory
Disaster preparedness